100 Crore Club is an unofficial designation by the Indian film trade and the media, related to Indian-language films that have net  (1billion Indian rupees) or more in India after deducting the entertainment tax. By 2012, the  box office target had become "a new benchmark for a film to be declared a hit", and those affiliated with the 100 Crore Club were considered part of the "elite strata" within the Indian film community.

It was succeeded by the 1000 Crore Club in 2017. Actors Salman Khan (15) and Akshay Kumar (15) are currently the highest holders.

Overview 

The first Indian film to cross  worldwide was the 1982 Bollywood film Disco Dancer, directed by Babbar Subhash, written by Rahi Masoom Raza, and starring Mithun Chakraborty, with over 90 crore grossed at the Soviet box office. The first Indian film to gross over 100 crore domestically in India was the Salman Khan and Madhuri Dixit starrer Hum Aapke Hain Kaun (1994), which was also the first to reach  worldwide. The next film to cross  worldwide was the Shah Rukh Khan and Kajol starrer Dilwale Dulhania Le Jayenge (1995).

The 100 Crore Club emerged more than a decade later, when the Aamir Khan starrer Ghajini (2008) became the first Indian film to net over 100 crore domestically in India, soon after which the term "100 Crore Club" was coined. The later Aamir Khan films 3 Idiots (2009), Dhoom 3 (2013), PK (2014) and Dangal (2016) expanded the club to 200, and 300 domestically whereas 400, 500, 600 and 700 crore worldwide. Overseas, the first Indian film to gross 100 crore in international markets was the Shah Rukh Khan-Kajol-starrer My Name is Khan (2010), followed by 3 Idiots in 2011.

Beyond Bollywood, the first South Indian film to gross over 100 crore worldwide was 2007 Rajinikanth starring Tamil film Sivaji. The first Telugu film to enter the "100 Crore club" was 2009 film by S.S. Rajamouli, Magadheera. In May 2016, Sairat become the first Marathi film to gross over  worldwide. In 2016, Mohanlal starring Pulimurugan became the first Malayalam film to enter the club. First Kannada movie to enter 100 Crore club was KGF directed by Prashanth Neel, released in 2018, starring Yash and Srinidhi Shetty crossing 153 crores in 11 days.

When adjusted for inflation, the first Indian film to gross an adjusted 100 crore was the 1940 film Zindagi, directed by P.C. Barua and written by Javed Hussain. The first Indian film to gross an adjusted 100 crore overseas was the 1951 film Awaara, directed by Raj Kapoor, written by Khwaja Ahmad Abbas, and starring Raj Kapoor and Nargis, becoming a blockbuster in the Soviet Union.

The Hindustan Times claims that their magazine Brunch coined the term. Initially the term applied only to the lead male actor. Komal Nahta stated that "excluding women from the group is characteristic of an industry which exercises gender discrimination more than other industries." By 2013, the usage had expanded to variously include the film itself, the director, and the lead female actor. The Zee Cine Awards added a category "The Power Club Box Office" to recognise directors whose films had reached the 100 crore mark. The 100 Crore Club designation has replaced previous Bollywood indications of success which had included great music, the "Silver Jubilee" or the "Diamond Jubilee" (films that ran for 75 weeks in theatres).

However, DNA reported that "Filmmakers and distributors are known to leave no stone unturned in their attempt to cross over to the right side" of the 100 crore mark." The Times of India cancelled its "Box Office" column in November 2013 because "The stakes of filmmakers have increased so much that they are willing to go any distance to manipulate and jack up their numbers to beat each other's records." and the Times felt they were no longer able to provide accurate enough figures because "Films that have not reached the '100 crore mark but are close will insist that they have reached the '100 crore figure as they can't resist being in the '100 crore club.'"

The concentration on reaching the club has been criticised, with actor and producer Arshad Warsi stating, "I find this whole Rs. 100 crore club very stupid. How can every film releasing lately do a business of Rs. 100 crores all of a sudden? Instead of this, we need to concentrate on making good films." Shahid Kapoor called the designation a "fad" which was leading to "massy films which are very basic in their understanding and high on entertainment. But if we run only to achieve those figures then we will restrict ourselves as actors" On the other hand, Dibakar Banerjee, while agreeing with Kapoor about the impact on content stated, "I hope the club stays and grows to many more crores. Films as they do more business boost the confidence of audience and investors alike and everybody benefits." Priyanka Chopra said that being part of films in the 100 Crore Club allowed her to also do less commercial "women-oriented films", and lamented that as of December 2013, no woman oriented films had achieved the 100 Crore Club designation.

They were eventually succeeded by the 1000 Crore Club, when Baahubali 2: The Conclusion crossed the  mark in 2017.

Milestones
See 1000 Crore Club for milestones beyond ₹1,000 crore.

Worldwide

Domestic

Overseas

See also

 1000 Crore Club
 List of highest-grossing Indian films
 List of highest-grossing films in India
 List of highest-grossing Indian films in overseas markets
 List of highest-grossing films in China
 List of Soviet films of the year by ticket sales
 List of most expensive Indian films

Notes

References

Hindi cinema
Popular culture neologisms
Film and video terminology
Film box office
Telugu cinema
Kannada cinema